"Je voulais te dire que je t'attends" is a ballad song originally recorded in 1976 by the French singer Michel Jonasz. It was covered by The Manhattan Transfer in 1978 on the album Pastiche (fourth track), and released as a double A-sided single with a cover of Where Did Our Love Go reaching No 40 in the UK singles chart. Also by Isabelle Boulay, Diane Dufresne Maurane and Patrick Bruel in 2001 for Les Enfoirés' album L'Odysée des Enfoirés, and by Hoda, Lucie and Sofiane, three contestants of the French version of Star Academy 4 whose cover is available on the 2004 album Les Meilleurs Moments.

The most famous cover version was that of Belgian singer Jonatan Cerrada in 2003, the only one that was released as a single, which achieved a great success in Belgium (Wallonia), France and Switzerland. The song was the debut single for the singer from his album Siempre 23, on which it features as fourth track.

Track listings
 CD single
 "Je voulais te dire que je t'attends" — 4:04
 "Lettre à France" (live) — 3:04

 Digital download
 "Je voulais te dire que je t'attends" — 4:04

Charts and sales

Weekly charts

Year-end charts

Certifications

References

External links
 "Je voulais te dire que je t'attends", lyrics + music video

Jonatan Cerrada songs
Ultratop 50 Singles (Wallonia) number-one singles
Pop ballads
Songs written by Michel Jonasz
1976 songs
Sony BMG singles
2003 debut singles